Farnham is a village and civil parish in North Dorset, in the south of England, on Cranborne Chase,  northeast of Blandford Forum. In the 2011 census the parish had a population of 183.

Toponymy
The name Farnham derives from the Old English fearn (fern) and ham (homestead) and means an enclosure or homestead where ferns grow. In the Domesday Book of 1086 Farnham was recorded as Ferneham or Fernham.

History
The early settlement history of Farnham isn't clear. Iron Age and Romano-British field systems were created in the surrounding area generally, though traces haven't survived at Farnham. The present-day Farnham village has emerged from five separate settlements associated with clearings in hazel coppice; in the Domesday Book Ferneham or Fernham is recorded five times, though not all the entries refer to the present-day settlement. The book records 12 households with a total taxable value of 6 geld units. The county's sheriff at the time, Aiulf the chamberlain, owned some of the land.

For much of its history Farnham has been closely connected with Tollard Royal, the adjacent village and parish in the neighbouring county of Wiltshire. Tollard Farnham (or Farnham Tollard), a tithing to the north of Farnham village, was previously owned by the de Tollard family of Tollard Royal, and until 1885, when it was joined with Farnham, its dead were taken along a track named Burials Drove to be buried at Tollard Royal.

Augustus Pitt Rivers lived nearby on the Rushmore Estate. The village's inn became the Museum Hotel to cater for visitors, which numbered 12,000 per year at the peak of the museum's popularity. The Farnham collection was dispersed in the 1970s, with the British items going to the Salisbury and South Wiltshire Museum, and the ethnographic collections sold.

Geography
Farnham parish is situated at the head of the valley of the small Gussage Brook, on the dip slope of the hills of Cranborne Chase.

Demography

In the 2011 census Farnham civil parish had 105 dwellings, 92 households and a population of 183.

The population of the parish in the censuses between 1921 and 2001 is shown in the table below:

References

External links

Villages in Dorset